Several Canadian naval units have been named HMCS Columbia.
  (I) was a  that was originally commissioned as  until transfer to the Royal Canadian Navy in 1940 by way of the Royal Navy.
  (II) was a  that served in the RCN and Canadian Forces from 1959-1974.

Battle honours
 Atlantic 1940–1944

See also
 

Set index articles on ships
Royal Canadian Navy ship names